Quercamps is a commune in the Pas-de-Calais department in the Hauts-de-France region of France.

Geography
Quercamps lies about 10 miles (16 km) west of Saint-Omer, at the junction of the D206 and D225 roads.

Population

Places of interest
 The church of Notre-Dame, dating from the nineteenth century.

See also
Communes of the Pas-de-Calais department

References

Communes of Pas-de-Calais